The Staudte Family Murders case, also known as "The Antifreeze Murders", was a series of killings and attempted killings within the Staudte family of Springfield, Missouri, during a five-month period in 2012. Family matriarch Diane Staudte and her daughter, Rachel Staudte, committed the crimes together using antifreeze purchased off the internet, with the rationale that antifreeze sold online would not contain the added bittering agent in commercial chemicals making the ethylene glycol poison detectable. Diane's husband, Mark Staudte, was murdered first, followed five months later by her autistic 26-year-old son, Shaun Staudte. 24-year-old daughter Sarah Staudte had also been poisoned with the antifreeze, being taken to hospital in critical condition. Sarah survived the poisoning and later recovered, albeit with physical and neurological damage. Diane Staudte was sentenced to life in prison without the possibility of parole in 2016, while Rachel Staudte pleaded guilty to second-degree murder in May 2015 as part of a plea deal in exchange for testifying against her mother at her trial, eventually being sentenced in March 2016 to life in prison with the possibility of parole.

Background
Diane and Mark Staudte were a married couple living in a modest home in Springfield, Missouri with four children: Shaun Staudte (age 26), Sarah Staudte (age 24), Rachel Staudte (age 22), and Briana Staudte (age 9). The Staudte children had varying special needs, with Shaun being on the autism spectrum and still living at home, and Briana, then a fourth-grade student, having learning disabilities. In addition, Sarah Staudte, a university graduate with high grades but refused to get a job, had incurred a high amount of student loan debt and was also living at home with her parents. Diane favoured Rachel over the other siblings, and would routinely make a habit of praising Rachel and uploading photos of her onto social media. The family was musically talented and enjoyed religious-themed contemporary music; Diane was a church organist and trained nurse, and also the main source of income for the family, while Mark was the lead singer and guitarist of a local blues band called Messing With Destiny. Mark only brought in minimal income, sometimes taking odd jobs related to the band for extra earnings.

Diane and Rachel, after being arrested for the murders, claimed that the targeted family members were burdens on them. Diane alleged that Mark was lazy, would throw objects when angry, and that by the point of killing him, she "hated his guts". She claimed that Shaun was "worse than a pest" as he was always in the home and had trouble socializing with people due to his autism, leading her to kill him as well, although Rachel claimed that she initially had felt that her brother's death was unfair, arguing that her mother should have placed Shaun in assisted living instead. The murders of Mark and Shaun Staudte occurred within five months of each other. Both victims were found with a suspicious ring of blood around their mouths, but the deaths were not investigated any further, owing in part to Mark's lifestyle, which included alcohol consumption on a regular basis. Both bodies were cremated. Diane went further when she considered killing Sarah as well, owing to her not wanting to pay Sarah's student debt. The 24-year-old was poisoned, then later taken to a hospital by Diane because, according to Diane, she did not want the house to smell bad if Sarah died in it (by that point, Diane had used Mark's US$20,000 life insurance policy to move the family into another house with more space). Rachel was also bothered by the prospect of Sarah dying in the house, because she had moved into the room where Shaun had died, and claimed that it was unsettling to her. Sarah was admitted in critical condition, with organ failure and neurological damage presenting.

Investigation
An anonymous tip, later revealed to be from the Staudte family's local church pastor, alerted police to the deaths of Mark and Shaun Staudte possibly being connected with Sarah's acute symptoms. Multiple people who knew the Staudtes had observed that Diane was not expressing any grief for the loss of Mark and Shaun; instead, Diane frequented the social media platform Facebook and appeared aloof about the deaths. Family relative Michael Staudte revealed that there had not been any formal services to commemorate Shaun, and that he had only been informed of Shaun's passing after another relative had discovered it. Robert "Rob" Mancuso of Messing With Destiny recalled that Diane was behaving "like she was hosting a party! There was no sadness. I thought it was just her way of grieving."

When police investigated the case, Diane had been planning a future vacation to Florida and was still residing with Rachel in the house where Shaun had died and Sarah had fallen ill. Diane revealed that she and Rachel had poisoned their family members with antifreeze. They had sneaked the substance into energy drinks that Mark regularly consumed, as well as into Shaun's favorite soda pop, and had specifically bought it online so as to ensure that there was no noticeable taste to it when hidden. Unlike most antifreeze sold commercially for the general public, the antifreeze purchased by Diane and Rachel lacked an added bittering agent that would have left a foul taste to anything poisoned by it. A note was discovered in Rachel's purse, on which Rachel had written a bizarre poem that read, "Only the quiet ones will be left, my mother, my little sister and me." A hidden diary kept by Rachel revealed that Rachel herself had been involved directly with the murders, and that she had been aware of Mark's impending poisoning at least two months beforehand. Rachel and Diane also admitted that Briana Staudte was to be poisoned after Sarah's death because of the burden of her learning disabilities. Rachel Staudte pleaded guilty in May 2015 to two counts of second-degree murder and one count of first-degree assault. Her mother, Diane Staudte, pleaded guilty to two counts of murder in January 2016 and was sentenced to life in prison without the possibility of parole. Both Rachel and Diane have since appealed to vacate their pleas, with Rachel arguing, "when lawyers were appointed, my fear of men was not accommodated, leading to miscommunication, coercion (and) mental duress. Being in an interview room alone with a male detective was like being flayed alive."

Remaining family members
It is unclear what happened to Briana Staudte after the arrest of Diane and Rachel. Briana, then a fourth-grade student and minor child, had not yet been poisoned by her mother or sister. The girl, whose new name has not been identified by news sources due to her age, was placed in foster care. Sarah Staudte survived, but suffered severe organ damage and neurological damage as a result of the antifreeze. Her symptoms, initially thought to be flu-like, were later revealed to be caused by the poisoning. Sarah maintains a Facebook profile with information about the murder case, as well as a profile banner photo of her father performing in Messing With Destiny. Sarah was given the opportunity to read the following statement in court: "I prefer to be a survivor than a victim. I forgive my mom for what she did to me. But she not only took away my dad and brother, but she took away my lifestyle, livelihood and my independence." Sarah, who had been on the Dean's List during her years in university, was said by Greene County Prosecuting Attorney Dan Patterson to require "a guardian, and living in an assisted living facility" due to the effects of the poison on her body and mental state.

Public response
The public and media expressed disgust over Diane's favouritism towards Rachel, as well as her view of her disabled children as burdens. In particular focus was Rachel's attitude towards the murders; Rachel had written in her diary, prior to her father's death, "It's sad when I realized how my father will pass on in the next two months... Shaun, my brother, will move on shortly after... it will be tough getting used to the changes but everything will work out." After Shaun's murder, Rachel had posted a selfie on Facebook of herself sitting cross-legged and smiling, with a post that read, "don't think I've seen Mom [Diane] so chilled out like this in a long time." The case was covered extensively by various national and local news agencies. Additionally, the case was discussed at length in multiple true crime YouTube videos, and featured in a segment of 20/20, where Sarah Staudte was interviewed in recovery from her poisoning.

See also
 Shauna Taylor case

References

Murder in Missouri
People murdered in Missouri
2012 murders in the United States